Bahona College, established in 1966, is a general degree college situated at Bahona, in Jorhat district, Assam. Ram Kumar Baruah was the founder principal of the college. This college is affiliated with the Dibrugarh University.  It offers Higher Secondary and Under Graduate Courses in both Arts and Science.

Departments

Science
Physics: It offers Higher Secondary and Undergraduate Courses. 
Mathematics: It offers Higher Secondary and Undergraduate Courses.
Chemistry: It offers Higher Secondary and Undergraduate Courses.
Statistics: It offers Higher Secondary and Undergraduate Courses.
Botany: It offers Higher Secondary and Undergraduate Courses.
Zoology: It offers Higher Secondary and Undergraduate Courses.

Arts
 Assamese: It offers Higher Secondary and Undergraduate Courses.
 English: It offers Higher Secondary and Undergraduate Courses.
History: This department is headed by Prof. Keshab Nath. It offers Major and Non-Major courses for undergraduate students under Dibrugarh University syllabus. It has a rich museum and library.  
Education: It is a department with four faculty members. Dr. Indrani Borthakur is the senior most professor and Head of the Department. It offers Major and Non Major courses for undergraduate students under Dibrugarh University syllabus. This department has a rich laboratory and library.
Economics: This is a department with four faculty members- Prof. Binoda Bora is the senior most faculty followed by Dr. Rafique Ahmed, Prof. Mainu Moni Saikia and Dr. Reema Rabha. It offers Major and Non Major courses for undergraduate students under Dibrugarh University syllabus. Dr. Ahmed is the present Head of the Department. 
Political Science: This Department was established in 1966. It offers Major and Non Major courses for undergraduate students under Dibrugarh University syllabus. Presently it has a strength of 90 seats in Major. It is a department with four faculty members. Prof. Sanjay Mili, a Rajiv Gandhi University Post Graduate is the Head of the Department. Prof. Ranjit Pegu is the second senior most faculty of the department who did his masters from Dibrugarh University. Dr. Mridul Dutta did his MA and PhD from Dibrugarh University. The youngest faculty of the department is Dr. Pankaj Bora. Dr. Bora completed his graduation from prestigious Cotton College and completed his Master Degree from Gauhati University. He did his Ph.D on livelihood security under the supervision of Prof. Akhil Ranjan Dutta from Gauhati University. Department of Political Science has a rich department library It has two self sponsored courses- Certificate Course on Human Rights and Certificate Course on Leadership and Governance.

References

External links
http://www.bahonacollege.edu.in/

Universities and colleges in Assam
Colleges affiliated to Dibrugarh University
Educational institutions established in 1966
1966 establishments in Assam